Walter Livingstone Brown (September 5, 1846 – February 3, 1924) was an American politician from New York.

Life
Born in Carlisle, Schoharie County, New York, Brown attended the common schools. In 1868, he removed to Albany where he worked in a hardware store. In 1872, he removed to Oneonta and opened there his own hardware store. He also engaged in dairy farming. He served five years as the First-Lieutenant of the Third Separate Company of the New York National Guard.

He was Supervisor of the Town of Oneonta from 1882 to 1888; and a member of the New York State Assembly in 1888, 1889, 1891, 1892 (all four Otsego Co., 2nd D.) and 1893 (Otsego Co.).

He was a member of the New York State Senate (33rd D.) from 1896 to 1898, and from 1903 to 1906; sitting in the 119th, 120th, 121st, 126th, 127th, 128th and 129th New York State Legislatures.

Brown died while wintering in Montebello, California, at the age of 77.

References

Sources
 The New York Red Book compiled by Edgar L. Murlin (published by James B. Lyon, Albany NY, 1897; pg. 135f, 404, 506f and 509f)
 New York State Legislative Souvenir for 1893 with Portraits of the Members of Both Houses by Henry P. Phelps (pg. 26)

1846 births
Republican Party New York (state) state senators
People from Oneonta, New York
Republican Party members of the New York State Assembly
People from Schoharie County, New York
Town supervisors in New York (state)
1924 deaths